Kang Hong-seok (born February 11, 1986) is a South Korean actor.

Personal life
Kang married musical actress, Kim Ye-eun on 26 September 2016. Their daughter was born on 11 February 2019.

Filmography

Television series

Film

Variety show

Theater

Awards and nominations

References

External links

Living people
1986 births
21st-century South Korean male actors
South Korean male musical theatre actors